Mesagraecia is an Asian genus of bush crickets in the tribe Agraeciini, belonging to the 'conehead' subfamily Conocephalinae.  Records to date have all been from Indochina.

Species
The Orthoptera Species File lists:
Mesagraecia bicolor Ingrisch, 1998 - type species - locality Chanthaburi, Thailand
Mesagraecia gorochovi Ingrisch, 1998
Mesagraecia larutensis Tan, Ingrisch & Kamaruddin, 2015
Mesagraecia laticauda (Karny, 1926)

References

External links 
 

Conocephalinae
Tettigoniidae genera
Orthoptera of Asia